Into the Blue Again is the fourth album by The Album Leaf, released in 2006.

Track listing 
"The Light" – 4:29
Jimmy LaValle – Rhodes Piano, Bass, Organ, Voyager, Synthesizer
Ryan Hadlock – Space Echo
Matthew Resovich – Violin
"Always for You" – 5:07
Jimmy LaValle – Vocals, Rhodes Piano, Guitar, Synth Bass, Bass, Synthesizers, Organ, Drums, Drum Programming
"Shine" – 5:53
Jimmy LaValle – Rhodes Piano, Keyboards, Synthesizers, Bass, Glockenspiel, Drums, Drum Programming
Joshua Eustis – Drum Programming
Matthew Resovich – Violin
"Writings on the Wall" – 4:55
Jimmy LaValle – Vocals, Rhodes Piano, Murf, Synthesizers, Bass, Drums
Matthew Resovich – Violin
"Red-Eye" – 7:01
Jimmy LaValle – Rhodes Piano, Grand Piano, Murf, Synthesizers, Synth Bass, Drum Programming
Joshua Eustis – Drum Programming
Matthew Resovich – Violin
"See in You" – 4:37
Jimmy LaValle – Rhodes Piano, Organ, Synthesizers, Drum Programming
Drew Andrews – Guitar
"Into the Sea" – 4:31
Jimmy LaValle – Rhodes Piano, Murf, Synth Bass, Bass, Drums, Drum Programming
Matthew Resovich – Violin
Drew Andrews – Guitar
"Wherever I Go" – 4:38
Jimmy LaValle – Vocals, Rhodes Piano, Grand Piano, Synthesizer, Bass, Drums
Matthew Resovich – Violin
Drew Andrews – Guitar
Pall Jenkins – Vocals
"Wishful Thinking" – 5:32
Jimmy LaValle – Grand Piano, Acoustic Guitar, Glockenspiel
Matthew Resovich – Violin
Ryan Hadlock – Space Echo
"Broken Arrow" – 5:50
Jimmy LaValle – Rhodes Piano, Organ, Synthesizers, Synth Bass, Drum Programming, Cricket Sound
Matthew Resovich – Violin
Joshua Eustis – Cowbell Synth, Drum Programming

References

External links 
 

2006 albums
The Album Leaf albums
Albums recorded at Bear Creek Studio